The Mahāsaṃnipāta Sūtra (Chinese: 大方等大集經, pinyin: Dàfāng děng dà jí jīng, Japanese: Daijuku-kyō or Daishik-kyō) is an anthology of Mahayana Buddhist sutras. The meaning in English is the Sutra of the Great Assembly or The Great Compilation. The sutra was translated into Chinese by Dharmakṣema, beginning in the year 414. The anthology consists of 17 sutras across 60 fascicles, but the only extant copy of the entire collection is found in Chinese, though individual sutras can be found in Sanskrit and Tibetan.

Content 
The Chinese edition of the Mahāsaṃnipāta Sūtra (Taisho Tripitaka # 397) contains the following sutras:

 The Jewel Necklace Sūtra
 The Dhāraṇiśvararāja Bodhisattva Sūtra
 The Jewel Maiden Sūtra
 The Animiṣa Bodhisattva Sūtra
 The Sāgaramati Bodhisattva Sūtra / Sāgaramati­paripṛcchā 
 The Anupalambha Bodhisattva Sūtra
 The Anabhilāpya Bodhisattva Sūtra
 The Ākāśagarbha Sūtra
 Ratnaketudhāraṇī Sūtra
 The Gaganacakṣus Sūtra / Gaganagañjaparipṛcchā
 The Ratnacūḍa Sūtra
 Akṣayamatinirdeśa Sūtra
 The Sūryaguhya Sūtra
 The Sūryagarbha Sūtra
 The Candragarbha Sūtra
 The Sumerugarbha Sūtra
 Bodhisattvas of the Ten Directions Sūtra

The Candragarbha Sutra's theory of the three eras 
Sutra number 15 in the collection is particularly influential because it enumerates the notion of the decline of the Dharma, or decline of the Buddha's teachings, dividing this into three eras, subdivided by 5 five-hundred periods of time:

 Former Day of the Law
 The first five hundred year period will be the "age of enlightenment"
 The second five hundred period will be the "age of meditation"
 Middle Day of the Law
 The third five hundred year period will be the "age of reading, reciting, and listening."
 The fourth five hundred year period will be the "age of building temples and stupas"
 Latter Day of the Law
 The fifth five hundred year period will be the "age of conflict," where “quarrels and disputes will arise among the adherents to my teachings, and the pure Law will become obscured and lost.”

The anthology also discusses the arising of the aspiration for Enlightenment, similar to the Dasabhumika Sutra and the Lotus Sutra.

References

Mahayana sutras